Joseph Benjamin Stenbuck (December 22, 1891 – June 1, 1951) was a leading Manhattan surgeon at Sydenham and Harlem Hospital.

Biography
He was born on December 22, 1891 in New York City. He married Erna Mankiewicz (1901–1979), she was the sister of Joseph L. Mankiewicz and Herman Mankiewicz.

He was accused of working for Soviet intelligence and acting as a dead drop and receiver of stolen blueprints for Robert Osman in 1933. That same year he was working in Harlem Hospital. In 1934 he was president of the Mount Sinai Hospital alumni executive board. In 1939 he was made a medical officer (battalion chief) earning $5,000 a year in the New York City Fire Department.

He died on June 1, 1951.

Publications

References

Further reading
 New York FBI report, 19 January 1945, Comintern Apparatus file, serial 3899.

1891 births
1951 deaths
American surgeons
American spies for the Soviet Union
Espionage in the United States
20th-century surgeons